I.V. Lab Studios is a recording facility located in Chicago, Illinois. The studio has been used to record and mix albums by acts ranging from Umphrey's McGee, Sidewalk Chalk and even to the well-known gospel artist Anthony Brown.

History 
I.V. Lab Studios was established in 2004 by producer and engineer, Manny Sanchez, who originally started at Chicago Recording Company (CRC). The studio was located on North Sheridan Road in a building that was previously a bank vault.  The vault was entrapped by cement walls three feet thick. In July 2013, Sanchez moved the studio from a 3,500 sq.-ft. building to a bigger building that is currently located on North Clybourn.

Studio 
I.V Labs has three primary rooms that are open to its staff and clients. Studio A is the biggest room in the building and possesses the 1984 SSL 4056e with G+ Computer (Brown EQ). Studio B is home to the API 1608 console, the first 32 input to be installed in Chicago. Lastly, there is the lounge.

I.V. Lab offers post production and mastering services.  An artist/band can choose to have a recording synced with video with their recording session, which continues to grow more popular.

Staff 
I.V. Labs has a total of seven staff members.

Manny Sanchez (CEO, engineer, producer) 2004–present
Rollin Weary (Partner, recording engineer, producer, songwriter, and technician - nominated for Producer of the Year/2013)  2004–present
Shane Hendrickson (Partner and engineer) 2008–present
Chris Harden (Partner, Engineer and producer, musician) 2004–present
Jay Marino (Arranger, performer and audio engineer) 2007–present
Mike Sportiello (Sr. Studio Manager and a recording engineer) 2012–present

Equipment 
I.V. Lab hosts a plethora of gear and accessories i.e. microphones, instruments along with keyboards, synthesizers, drum kits, both guitars and bass guitars along with other outboard gear including mic preamps, equalizers, dynamics, and effects at their disposal to produce a fine tuned product.

Selected recordings

References 

2004 establishments in the United States
2004 establishments in Illinois
Recording studios in the United States
Buildings and structures in Chicago
Organizations established in 2004